The Spatangidae are a family of heart urchins. There are three recognised genera within the family; Granopatagus, Plethotaenia, and Spatangus. Additionally, Prospatangus was previously a recognised genus within the Spatangidae, but is now accepted as part of the genus Spatangus.

The Spatangidae are marine heart urchins that feed on subsurface deposits and graze.

References

 
Spatangoida
Echinoderm families